Wayne Tefs (1947 – September 15, 2014) was a Canadian novelist, writer, editor, critic, and anthologist.

Personal life

Tefs lived in Winnipeg, Manitoba, with his wife, Kristen Wittman, a commercial lawyer and poet. Tefs was born the middle of three children in St. Boniface, Manitoba (then an independent community east of the old Winnipeg) to Armin and Stella Tefs, and grew up in Northwestern Ontario. He often wrote about the Canadian Shield country of Ontario and the North.

In 1994 he was diagnosed with a rare and terminal cancer, which he contended with the aid of biological modification drugs and radio-isotope therapies. He died on September 15, 2014.

Education

In 1971 he graduated from the University of Manitoba and received the gold medal for Arts Honours.  He was awarded a Woodrow Wilson Fellowship and took his M.A. at the University of Toronto.
He was a lecturer at the University of Saskatchewan (Regina Campus) from 1972-1974 before completing a PhD at the University of Manitoba in 1978.  He received a certificate of education from McGill University in 1981.

Career

Tefs was a Woodrow Wilson Fellow and taught at a number of Canadian universities and colleges. From 1978 to 1992, he was Head of English at St. John's-Ravenscourt School in Winnipeg. He also taught at the University of Regina, McGill University, and the University of Winnipeg. He was a co-founder with David Arnason of Turnstone Press and served as the press's fiction editor from 1995 until close to his death in 2014. He also founded the literary magazine The Sphynx. From 1975 to 1977 he and David Arnason produced the radio program Canadian Writers Symposium, for which they interviewed 45 Canadian writers, including well-known figures such as Milton Acorn, George Bowering, Patrick Lane, Daphne Marlatt, W.O. Mitchell, P.K. Page, Al Purdy, and Adele Wiseman. He published numerous newspaper and magazine articles, and dozens of critical reviews. In 1983, his first novel, Figures on a Wharf, was short-listed for the Books in Canada First Novel Award. It was followed by The Cartier Street Contract in 1985 and seven more novels in later years, as well as the posthumously published Barker. In 2000, his novel Moon Lake received the inaugural Margaret Laurence Award for fiction, and in 2007, Be Wolf received the McNally Robinson Book of the Year Award. His short story Red Rock and After received the Canadian Magazine Fiction Gold Medal and was reprinted in The Journey Anthology (1990).  He also edited three anthologies of short fiction, published the collection of short fiction Meteor Storm in 2010, and wrote the memoirs Rollercoaster:A Cancer Journey (2002), about living with cancer, and On the Fly (2012), about sport fandom and his lifelong involvement with hockey. Another memoir about living with cancer, Dead Man on a Bike: Riding with Cancer, was published posthumously in 2016.

Articles
 Our Tour de France, The Globe and Mail, 5 July 2008
 Les Rois Tragiques du Ring, in L'Impossible, September 1992
 Tragic Lords of the Ring, The Globe and Mail, 22 May 1992
 The Last Hurrah, West, August, 2000
 Of Ice and Men, The Globe and Mail, 7 October 2001
 The Goalie Mask, West, March 1991

Bibliography
 Figures on a Wharf - 1983
 The Cartier Street Contract - 1985
 The Canasta Players - 1990
 Dickie - 1993
 Red Rock - 1997
 Home Free - 1998
 Moon Lake - 2000
 Rollercoaster, a cancer journey - 2002
 4X4 - 2004
 Be Wolf – 2007
 Meteor Storm - 2009
 Bandit - 2011
 On the Fly - 2012
 Barker - 2015

Awards and recognition
In 1999, Red Rock was featured in its entirety on CBC radio's Between the Covers.  In 2010 Red Rock was cited in T. F. Rigelhof's Hooked on Canadian Books as "one of my first five choices" to be placed on a Canada Reads list.  In 2010 Red Wing Films released a documentary on Tefs. The posthumously published novel Barker was long-listed for a 2015 Relit Award.

References

1947 births
2014 deaths
Canadian male novelists
Canadian literary critics
University of Toronto alumni
20th-century Canadian novelists
21st-century Canadian novelists
Writers from Ontario
Writers from Winnipeg
20th-century Canadian male writers
21st-century Canadian male writers
Canadian male non-fiction writers